Jundab ibn Ka'b al-Azdi was a companion of Muhammad and Ali ibn Abu Talib, cousin of Muhammad. He fought alongside Ali at the Battle of Jamal and at Siffin. He remained loyal to Ali and his cause, along with Malik al-Ashtar, Ammar ibn Yasir and Miqdad

References
 

People from Mecca
Sahabah hadith narrators